NGC 109 is a spiral galaxy estimated to be about 240 million light-years away in the constellation of Andromeda. It was discovered by Heinrich d'Arrest in 1861 and its magnitude is 13.7.

Notes

References

External links
 

0109
00251
001633
Andromeda (constellation)
Astronomical objects discovered in 1861
Discoveries by Heinrich Louis d'Arrest
Barred spiral galaxies